The Center for Women Writers is a literary arts organization based at Salem College in Winston-Salem, North Carolina. The Center for Women Writers was established in 1996, which coincided with the 225th anniversary of the opening of Salem Academy & College. The first director was Annette Allen. In addition to hosting literary arts events, the Center for Women Writers underwrites an annual January Term Writer-in-Residence and manages the International Literary Awards, initially called the National Literary Awards.  These awards include the Reynolds Price Short Fiction Award, Rita Dove Poetry Award, and the Penelope Niven Creative Nonfiction Award.

Past winners

Short fiction
 2003 - Sheryl Monks
 2004 - Jennifer S. Davis 
 2007 - Bonnie Jo Campbell
 2008 - Becky Hagenston
 2009 - Jacob Appel
 2011 - Colette Sartor
 2013 - T.D. Storm
 2014 - Bushra Rehman
 2015 - Kerry Hill
 2016 - JoeAnne Hart
 2017 - Jaquira Díaz
 2018 - Kristen Gentry
2019- Elizabeth Edelglass
2020- Kanza Javed

Poetry
 2004 - Ann Fisher-Wirth
 2007 - Mary F. Morris 
 2008 - Terry Godbey
 2009 - Susan Lilley
 2010 -
 2011 - Susan A. Cohen
 2012 -
 2013 -
 2014 - Joseph Bathanti
 2015 - Jaimie Gusman
 2016 - J.C. Todd
 2017 - Danielle Zaccagnino
 2018 - Annie Virginia
 2019 - Laura Minor
 2020 - Chelsea Bunn

Nonfiction
 2003 - Maureen Stanton
 2004 - Catherine Rainwater 
 2007 - M.B. McLatchey 
 2008 - Pascha A. Stevenson 
 2009 - Maria Hummel
 2010 -
 2011 - Mako Yoshikawa
 2012 -
 2013 -
 2014 - Brandel France de Bravo
 2015 - Melissa Febos
 2016 - Jessica Reidy
 2017 - Lisa Locascio
 2018 - Eliza Smith
 2019 - Jen Soriano
 2020 - Maria Isabelle Carlos

See also
 List of American literary awards
 List of literary awards

References

External links
National Literary Award

American fiction awards
Awards established in 2002
2002 establishments in North Carolina
Salem College